Tinea atmogramma is a species of moth in the family Tineidae. It was described by Edward Meyrick in 1927. However the placement of this species within the genus Tinea is in doubt. As a result, this species has been referred to as Tinea (s.l.) atmogramma. This species is endemic to New Zealand.

References

External links
Image of type specimen of Tinea s.l. atmogramma.

Moths described in 1927
Tineinae
Moths of New Zealand
Endemic fauna of New Zealand
Taxa named by Edward Meyrick
Endemic moths of New Zealand